Neath East is an electoral ward of Neath Port Talbot county borough, Wales.  Neath East falls within the community of Neath.

Neath East includes some or all of the neighbourhoods of Melincryddan, Pencaerau, Penrhiwtyn in the parliamentary constituency of Neath.  It is bounded by the wards of Coedffranc Central to the northwest; Dyffryn and Neath North to the north; Neath South and Cimla to the east; and Briton Ferry West and Briton Ferry East to the south.

The ward contains marshland to the west, an industrial and residential area in the middle and grassland and woodland to the east.

Election results
In the 2017 local council elections, the results were:

In the 2012 local council elections, the electorate turnout was 27.15%.  The results were:

References

Electoral wards of Neath Port Talbot
Neath